Dr. A. Chellakumar is an Indian politician and  Member of parliament. He was elected to the Tamil Nadu legislative assembly as an Indian National Congress (INC) candidate from Anna Nagar constituency in the 1991 election and as a Tamil Maanila Congress (Moopanar) (TMC) candidate from T. Nagar constituency in the 1996 election. He was unsuccessful in winning the Villivakkam constituency in 2001. and in the 2011 election he attempted once again to gain the T. Nagar seat. His candidacy in 2001 was as a TMC member and in 2011 it was for the INC. He was runner-up on both occasions.

Although he had joined the TMC breakaway group in 1996 when factionalism beset the INC due to a decision to ally with the All Indian Anna Dravida Munnetra Kazhagam (AIADMK) in the state, Chellakumar subsequently fell out with TMC founder G. K. Moopanar. His career  then stalled for some years until, seen as a neutral figure with the INC, into which the TMC had re-merged, he was one of three people appointed as a secretary to the Tamil Nadu All India Congress Committee in 2013.

Chellakumar unsuccessfully contested the Krishnagiri Lok Sabha constituency for the INC in the 2014 elections for the Parliament of India, where he finished in a distant fourth place. A major reorganisation of the INC was thought to be necessary following its worst-ever defeat in those elections and as part of that process Chellakumar replaced Digvijaya Singh in April 2017 as the person in charge of the party's affairs in Goa. He was considered  at that time to be close to Rahul Gandhi, the son of party president Sonia Gandhi and vice president of party. In the 2019 elections, he contested again from the Krishnagiri constituency and was elected as a member of Parliament.
He is highly known for his simplicity and connectivity with Poor people .He is more popularly called as 'Doctor'by people.

References 

Indian National Congress politicians from Tamil Nadu
Tamil Maanila Congress politicians
Living people
Tamil Nadu MLAs 1996–2001
United Progressive Alliance candidates in the 2014 Indian general election
Year of birth missing (living people)
India MPs 2019–present
Tamil Nadu MLAs 1991–1996